Hughesy, We Have a Problem was an Australian comedy panel television series which premiered on Network 10 on 30 January 2018. The program was hosted by Dave Hughes, who along with a panel of comedians, attempted to solve problems of viewers, guests, panellists or the host. Hughesy, We Have a Problem was filmed at Network 10 Studios in Pyrmont, a suburb in Sydney's inner city.

On Monday 23 December 2019, Hughesy, We Have a Problem aired its first Christmas special episode.

In October 2021, Network 10 officially announced that the show had been cancelled after five seasons.

Format

Segments
Viewer Problem
Video Problem
Audience Problem
Guest Problem
Hughesy's Problem
Pin The Problem
Yes or No Problem
Celebrity Problem
Mystery Celebrity Problem

Production
The program was announced in October 2017, with Hughes defecting from his previous contract with the Nine Network as a co-host of The Footy Show to host the new Network Ten format, which was commissioned for 8 episodes and filmed in late 2017. The series is produced by Screentime. Due to positive social media feedback, Network Ten renewed the show for a second season, which aired from the week following the season one finale.

In May 2018, the series was renewed for a third season.

Episodes

Season 1 (2018)
Hughesy's Problem: Katrina Warren (Ep1), Richard McCluskey (Ep2), Nikki Webster (Ep3), Cherie Barber (Ep7), Holly Ife (Ep8)

Season 2 (2018)
Other guest(s): Katrina Warren (Ep1), Nick Rushworth (Ep5), Louise Mahler, Derek Boyer (Ep6), Denise Becus (Ep7), Jake Meney (Ep8).
Hughesy's Problem: Jimmy Rees (Ep3), Dee Madigan (Ep4), Costa Georgiadis (Ep6), Mark Lane (Ep7), Nathan Phillips (Ep8)

Season 3 (2019)
Other guest(s): Sam Priestley from Men on Fire Australia, Gaspare (Ep1), Hewy & Lenny Fitzgerald, Mitch & Matt & Tim Simmons (Ep3), Nick Curnow (Ep5), Andrew Rochford, Buster Pop Pop (Ep6), Dan Rumsey, Harry T (Ep7), Isaac Heeney & Phil Davis, Morgana Muses (Ep8), Daniel Reader (Ep10), Kurt Fearnley (Ep12), Barry Du Bois (Ep13), Benjamin Cav (Ep14).
Hughesy's Problem: Andrew Rochford, Leon Nacson, Rick Barker from Tilligerry Permaculture Farm, Julie Goodwin, Hughesy's wife & children, Skye Nicolson, Daniel Lanzer, Max Markson, Kate Adams, Naomi McCullum, Stephanie Bendixsen, Bill Shorten, Sam Milliken, Remington Schulz.

Season 4 (2020)
Other guest(s): Charlotte Crosby, Red Beard (Ep1), Joe Hildebrand (Ep2), Melody's husband Nick (Ep3), Amina, Mandy (Ep4), Lukas (Ep5), Mandy, Colin, Alex, Phillip, Douglas & Pat Rafter (Ep6), Conrad, Chloe from Feature Creatures, Amanda King from Australian Finishing School (Ep7), Hypnotist "The Amazing Phoenix", Dr. Zac Turner (Ep8), Reese's husband Markay (Ep10), Alison Watts, Dr. Zac Turner (Ep11), Jaclyn's mum Janine, Dr. Juewei (Ep12), Lisa's husband Lionel (Ep13)
Hughesy's Problem: Tristan MacManus (Ep2), Jason Akermanis (Ep3), Dr. Nicholas Coleman (Ep5), Pamela Supple (Ep 8), Rodney O (Ep13)

Season 5 (2021)
Note: Problem Solvers Of The Week are listed in bold
Other guest(s): Grant Denyer, Katrina Risteska & Boston the Pug, Belinda "BJ" Irons (Ep 3), Lizzie Mack, Laurie Lawrence (Ep 4), Dan Thomas, Keith Urban (Ep 7) 
Hughesy's problem: Toni Pearen (Ep 2), Jodi (Karen from Brighton) (Ep 3), Dr Vyom Sharma (Ep 4), Holly Ife (Ep 6)

Specials
Other Guest(s): Angie Kent & Carlin Sterritt 
Hughesy's Problem: Steven from Alibi Restaurant & Bar in Sydney

References

English-language television shows
Network 10 original programming
2018 Australian television series debuts
2021 Australian television series endings
2010s Australian comedy television series
2020s Australian comedy television series
Television series by Screentime